DOP may stand for:

Science-related 

 Data-oriented parsing
 Degree of parallelism
 Degree of polarization
 Delta-opioid receptor
 Dermo-optical perception
 Dilution of precision (navigation), a term used in geomatics engineering to describe the geometric strength of satellite configuration
 Dioctyl phthalate, alternate name of Bis(2-ethylhexyl) phthalate, a PVC plasticizer
 Discrete oriented polytope or polyhedron in computer graphics
 DSD over PCM, a protocol for Direct Stream Digital audio

Other 

 Declaration of Principles, an agreement between Israel and Palestine, also known as the Oslo Accords
 Denominazione di Origine Protetta, the Italian equivalent of protected designation of origin
 Diocese of Parañaque
 Director of photography, alternate name for cinematographer
 Dolpa Airport, IATA airport code
 Dominican peso, by ISO 4217 currency code
 dOP (band), an electronic music group
 Dumbarton Oaks Papers, an academic journal founded in 1941
 Dingzhou East railway station, China Railway telegraph code DOP